In 2021 and 2022, over 6,500 workers at over 250 corporate-owned Starbucks stores in the United States voted to unionize with Workers United. The unionization effort started at a store in Buffalo, New York. About a third of Starbucks' Chilean workforce is already unionized, as well as 450 workers in New Zealand and one store in Canada. The longest Starbucks strike lasted 64 days, took place in Brookline, Massachusetts in September 2022 and resulted in the unionization of the employees at that location.

Previously in the United States, there had been inconsistent unionization efforts beginning in the 1980s. Many of those unions folded, in part due to the company's long history of opposing unionization efforts. Warehouse and roasting plant workers in Seattle were Starbucks' first to unionize in 1985. During contract negotiation, the bargaining unit expanded to include store workers but the same workers moved to decertify their representation within two years.

Starbucks stores and a distribution plant unionized in British Columbia in the mid-1990s through the mid-2000s. The company strongly opposed unionization efforts in the 2000s through present day, with multiple National Labor Relations Board complaints ending in settlements or findings of labor law violations. The Industrial Workers of the World led an organizing campaign in the mid-2000s based in New York City that did not result in union recognition.

In December 2021, the Elmwood Avenue store in Buffalo became the first location in the United States to unionize in the 2020s. The first union vote in Starbucks' hometown of Seattle was unanimously in favor of the union. As of October 2022, a total of 256 stores in 35 states voted in favor of unionizing and stores across the country are awaiting union votes.

Background 

Starbucks is the world's predominant multinational coffeehouse chain, selling specialty coffee, beverages, and assorted food in nearly 34,000 stores across 83 markets. The company is worth $100 billion as of 2021. Its largest markets are the United States (9,000 company-owned stores with 220,000 workers) and China (5,360 stores). Starbucks aims to grow its store count by 66% across 100 international markets by 2030. Beverages in the Americas, including United States, Canada and Latin America, are Starbucks's largest sales segments.

Starbucks refers to its baristas as "partners", calling them "partners in shared success". Staff are given vested shares of Starbucks stock after working for two years. Those who work 20 hours a week receive healthcare.

Historical unionization

United States 

Starbucks workers first voted to unionize with United Food and Commercial Workers (UFCW) Local 1001 in March 1985. The unit included about 120 people. Their contract, secured in 1986, brought health care coverage, paid vacation, and sick leave to Starbucks part-time workers in Seattle and its suburbs. Howard Schultz has oddly claimed credit for initiating "the first company in America to provide comprehensive health insurance to part-time people" despite that when Schultz became president of the company in 1987, he reneged on his pledge to honor that contract, and that it had been the standard for more than a decade prior for UFCW part-timers. In new negotiations, Schultz wanted to expand the warehouse and roasting plant bargaining unit to include workers from the 11 Starbucks stores. This approach intended for the larger, diluted unit to reject the union but backfired when the store workers did the opposite. Schultz proposed reductions in medical benefits, work hours, just-cause termination protections established in the prior contract. These negotiations, interrupted by a movement to decertify the union, did not result in a collective bargaining contract.

One store employee, Daryl Moore, together with signatures of other workers opposed to the union, successfully moved to decertify the union in late 1987. The union for warehouse and roasting plant workers was also decertified in 1992. While company president Schultz wrote that the company had no involvement in the employee's decertification filing, local union leaders said that the company management had made the decertification filing and hired anti-union consultants and lawyers to help. In his 1997 memoir, Pour Your Heart Into It, Schultz defended his decisions saying, "If [Starbucks workers] had faith in me and my motives, they wouldn’t need a union."

In 2014, Starbucks workers started two petitions on Coworker.org, one demanding the company overturn its "no-tattoo policy", and the other to better scheduling practices.

Between 1992 and 2021, the only unionized Starbucks employees were those who worked for other companies with unionized labor and a licensing agreement, such as those who operated kiosks in unionized supermarkets.

Industrial Workers of the World 
In 2004, Industrial Workers of the World (IWW or wobblies) led a grassroots campaign called "Starbucks Workers Union" in which workers across a number of cities, including Chicago, Illinois and New York City started organizing unions. The IWW, which works outside the mainstream American labor movement, intended to prove that unions could break into the fast food industry. In New York City in 2006, four Manhattan stores ran an unsuccessful union drive with the campaign. The workers cited unlivable wages and difficulty securing enough hours to earn health benefits. The campaigns led to a series of National Labor Relations Board (NLRB) cases that uncovered how corporate executives coordinated to fill union-supporting stores with anti-union hires.

In 2008, the NLRB found that during the campaign, Starbucks committed 30 labor violations, including unlawfully terminating and threatening to discharge other union organizers to ward off union activity, unlawful surveillance and interrogation, and prohibiting the workers from discussing the union on their breaks. Starbucks denied any wrongdoing, and one charge that an employee was fired for organizing, to be rehired with back pay, was reversed on appeal. A 2007 complaint to the Occupational Safety and Health Administration about animal and insect infestation found other violations but no health hazards.

Barista Erik Forman at the Mall of America 1 Starbucks in Bloomington, MN was fired and then reinstated in 2008 under an NLRB settlement of a complaint of being fired for organizing. In a 2019 Philadelphia union drive, the company fired two organizing employees, which the labor board ruled unlawful. Starbucks appealed the verdict. In June 2021, the company was again found to have been engaged in certain unfair labor practices in the case.

Canada 
When 12 stores and a distribution plant in British Columbia unionized in the mid-1990s, Starbucks extended the contract to non-union stores to mitigate unionization incentives, which it tried to undo in the subsequent contract. Western Canada union representation ended in the mid-2000s. More Starbucks stores unionized in Canada. A Quebec City store briefly unionized in 2009 through the IWW.

In August 2020, a Victoria store joined United Steelworkers as the only unionized store in the country. Among their top grievances were COVID-19 pandemic safety precautions. They signed a three-year agreement in 2021.

Chile 
In 2011, the 200 workers in the Chilean Starbucks union Sindicato de Trabajadores de Starbucks Coffee Chile went on strike for better wages and health care, the first strike in the company's history. Their leaders began a hunger strike after receiving no corporate response from two weeks of striking. At the time, Chile had the company's largest union population, including about 30% of its 670 workers since the company entered the country in 2003. American IWW Starbucks Workers Union employees planned a "global week of action" in solidarity with the unaffiliated Chilean union.

New Zealand 
Unite, a new union in New Zealand, led demonstrations against Starbucks in 2005 and negotiated a contract with the country's Starbucks operator offering 450 workers better pay and hours.

Starbucks Workers United 
Workers led by Jaz Brisack from the Elmwood Avenue Starbucks store in Buffalo, New York, voted to unionize in late 2021, making it the only unionized shop among the chain's 9,000 company-owned stores in the United States. Two other Buffalo stores voted concurrently, of which one voted to unionize and the other did not. The workers joined Workers United of the Service Employees International Union. They sought to redress issues of under-staffing and under-training, issues that have been long associated with the company and exacerbated during the COVID-19 pandemic. The successful union vote was recognized as a symbolic victory for the American labor movement and came during a time of heightened unionization activity in the country in an industry known for low unionization rates (1.2% of American food service workers).

During the union drive, the company sent other managers and executives, including its North America retail president, to Buffalo to engage with employees about operational issues and participate in their work. Employees were forced to attend captive audience meetings that contained anti-union messages. Starbucks temporarily closed some area stores for remodeling and added excessive staff to one of the stores preparing to vote. Workers said this reduced union support there, while Starbucks said the support was meant to compensate for increased sick leave during the pandemic as it had done elsewhere in the country.

The company also requested that all 20 Buffalo-area stores vote simultaneously, as close to half of area employees worked at more than one store that year. This approach generally works against unionization and would have expanded the voting pool from 81 employees to 450. The NLRB sided against the company twice, letting stores vote as individual units and not delaying the vote count further. The ballot was conducted by mail. Separately, workers filed a NLRB complaint of company intimidation and surveillance to discourage the union drive. Prior to the vote's scheduling, Starbucks announced a minimum wage increase to $15 per hour and pay raises for tenured workers. Starbucks is represented by Littler Mendelson.

Inspired by the success at Elmwood in Buffalo, union organizing drives proliferated across the United States. At the beginning of November 2021, workers at 3 other Buffalo locations had filed petitions with the NLRB for union votes. In early January 2022, the number of stores that had filed petitions extended outside of the Buffalo area and the state of New York increased to more than 10. By the end of that January, more than 50 company-owned Starbucks stores in locations across the United States had petitioned for union recognition. By mid-February, the number increased to more than 70 across 20 states, and by the end of the month, to more than 100 stores across 25 states. In mid March 2022, the number grew to more than 150. Vice described the union drive as among the most promising initiatives to rebuild what had been a declining American labor movement.

The NLRB certified the first union outside of the Buffalo area on February 25, 2022 with a Mesa, Arizona location voting 25 to 3, with 3 votes being challenged.

On March 22, 2022, the first Seattle store voted to unionize, with the workers voting unanimously in favor of the union.

, a total of 100 stores voted in favor of unionizing. Workers and the NLRB at the challenged stores alleged stores that voted majority against unionizing were due to union busting, an allegation which Starbucks denies. 200 stores had organized by late July.

Strikes

Boston 
The longest Starbucks Union strike lasted 64 days, beginning on July 11, 2022 and ending on September 15, 2022 at the 874 Commonwealth Avenue location in Brookline, Massachusetts. This particular strike was sparked by a new hourly minimum policy that was going to be enforced on July 11, 2022. The policy was going to require workers to adjust their schedules to meet a minimum availability of hours. The workers at the Brookline Starbucks walked out on July 11, 2022. Strikers set up camp at the entrance to the restaurant and picketed for 64 days.

Union busting 

Starbucks has fought and strongly opposed unionization for decades.

Union organizers across the United States accused the company of a strong union-busting campaign during the Workers United campaign during 2021 and 2022. In early February, Starbucks fired multiple leaders of a Memphis, Tennessee, store's unionization efforts for breaking company store access policy, which the union described as an act of retaliation. Workers also alleged that Starbucks terminated other workers in the Buffalo stores. Baristas in Denver, Colorado, went on strike on March 11, 2022 due to what they alleged were threats to their job security and benefits if they petitioned to form a union. In the spring of 2022, Vice News obtained a leaked memo from Starbucks management telling baristas in Olympia, Washington, that "benefits and wages will essentially be frozen" during collective bargaining that could take a year or longer "if a contract is reached at all."

See also 

 Amazon worker organization
 Apple worker organizations
 REI worker organization
 List of Starbucks union petitions

References

External links 

 Starbucks Workers United
 Starbucks Corporation and Workers United: Amended Administrative Law Judges Decision: Detailed findings of extensive unfair labor practices at the Buffalo and Rochester Starbucks stores, 2023
 Workers United Complaint Against Starbucks (2021)

Further reading 

 
 
 
 
 
 
 
 

Criticisms of companies
Worker organization
Labor relations by company
Labor relations in New York (state)
Labor relations in Tennessee
Labor relations in the United States
Labor relations in Washington (state)